Chongshan Temple is a Buddhist temple located in Xushe Town of Yixing, Jiangsu, China.

History

Liang dynasty
The temple traces its origins to the former "Guanyin Hall", founded between 502 and 557 in the Liang dynasty (502–557) and would later become "Chongshan Temple" in the reign of Kangxi Emperor (1662–1922) in the Qing dynasty (1644–1911).

Yuan dynasty
During the Yuan dynasty (1271–1368), the temple gradually declined and suffered wear and tears.

Ming dynasty
In 1395, in the 8th year of Hongwu period (1368–1398) in the Ming dynasty (1368–1644), master Puzhi Yizhou raised funds to restore the Hall of Guanyin, Hall of Four Heavenly Kings, Hall of the God of Wealth, and wing-rooms.

In 1411, in the reign of Yongle Emperor (1402–1424), abbot Qingfo elected the Recitation Hall and Buddhist Texts Library. During the ruling of Emperor Yingzong (1457–1464), abbot Zhongxiu established the Mahavira Hall. The Hall of Bhaisajyaguru was added to the temple by abbot Chuanjiu under the rule of Chenghua Emperor (1465–1487).

Chongshan Temple was completely destroyed by fire during the Manchu invasion of the 17th century.

Qing dynasty
In 1664, in the 2nd year of Kangxi period (1662–1722) in the Qing dynasty (1644–1911), master Guanghui reconstructed the temple and renamed it "Chongshan Temple".

Most of the temple buildings were devastated in 1854 during the Taiping Rebellion, when the Taiping army were defeated by the Qing army.

In 1883, in the Guangxu era (1875–1908), abbot Yanlian restored the temple.

Chongshan Temple was gradually fell into ruin in the late Qing dynasty and early Republic of China.

People's Republic of China
After the establishment of the Communist State, abbot Quanyao refurbished and redecorated the temple.

Chongshan Temple was used as a warehouse in the Great Leap Forward.

Chongshan Temple reactivated its religious activities in 1995.

References

Buddhist temples in Jiangsu
Buildings and structures in Wuxi
Tourist attractions in Wuxi
19th-century establishments in China
19th-century Buddhist temples
Religious buildings and structures completed in 1883
Buddhist temples in Wuxi